NEGS is an independent Anglican school. Located in Armidale, Northern NSW, NEGS provides an educational experience for both boys and girls in Junior School and a tailored learning environment for young women in Senior School, with boarding houses to facilitate the educational needs of students located outside of Armidale.

Established in 1895 by Florence Emily Green, NEGS is a non-selective school, and currently caters for approximately 310 students from Pre-Preparatory (4 years old) to Year 12 (18 years old), including 140 boarders from Years 5 to 12.

NEGS is affiliated with the Association of Independent Schools of New South Wales (AIS NSW), the Junior School Heads Association of Australia (JSHAA), the Australian Boarding Schools' Association (ABSA), the Alliance of Girls' Schools Australasia (AGSA), and is an affiliate member of the Association of Heads of Independent Girls' Schools (AHIGS). NEGS Limited in its capacity as Trustee administers the school on behalf of the Anglican Diocese of Armidale.

History
NEGS was founded in 1895, by Florence Emily Green, a deeply religious educator from Oamaru, New Zealand. The aim of the school was to provide an all-round education for girls, with a strong emphasis on Christian values, in order to prepare students for the challenges of the new century. The school's first building was named 'Akaroa', and contained a large classroom, an office and boarding facilities. Today the building is the school's administration centre, with the original classroom now used for meetings and functions, and named the 'W.H. Lee Room' after the school's architect.

Under Miss Green's guidance NEGS became one of the largest girls' boarding schools in Australia. In 1907, NEGS was purchased by the Anglican diocese and a school Council was appointed. Miss Green subsequently moved to Victoria in 1908 to act as caretaker headmistress to Firbank Church of England Girls' Grammar School, in Brighton.

NEGS' first brick building, later known as "Northern and Southern", was opened in 1911. This building contained an assembly hall, gymnasium and boarding facilities.

During the principalship of Anna Abbott from 1990 to 2000, the International Baccalaureate was introduced, the Music program was expanded, and an ordained woman appointed to be the school's chaplain.

Principals

Campus 
The school is located in the city of Armidale, situated midway between Sydney and Brisbane on the New England Tablelands of New South Wales.

Some notable current facilities of the school include:
The NEGS Multi-Purpose Centre (MPC) with gymnasium facilities
The Aytoun Young Resource Centre
Arts and Crafts complex
All-weather tennis courts
Several sports ovals
Indoor and outdoor netball and basketball courts
International standard synthetic hockey field
Indoor and outdoor Equestrian arenas
Equestrian cross-country course
Polocrosse field
Computer laboratory
Library
Four Boarding Houses
Health Centre
Chapel of St Michael and All Angels

Badge
The New England Girls' School badge was designed shortly after the opening of the school, and is highly symbolic. The badge colours of scarlet and sky were chosen by Miss Green to be the official school colours. The shield of the badge is surmounted by the Bishop's mitre symbolising the power of the Holy Spirit, and the authority of the Church. On the shield itself, three figures are depicted: 
The seated lady is Charity or Mother Love.
The dove is Hope, while the olive branch represents Peace.
The open Bible on the Cross represents Faith.

All three together are drawn from the final verse of the school Bible reading: 

Beneath the shield is the school motto, Quodcumque facitis ex animo operamini, based on Colossians 3:23, which may be translated as "Whatsoever you do, do it heartily".

Coursework 
All pupils at NEGS follow the NSW academic curriculum, completing numeracy and literacy tests in junior school, and the NSW Higher School Certificate in year twelve. Senior school students are also tested in all of their subjects at the middle and end of each academic year, allowing classes in English and Mathematics to be streamed according to ability.

In the coeducational junior school, students study English, Mathematics, HSIE, PDHPE and technology with their classroom teachers. They also learn languages (German, French or Latin), Music, Drama and Art from specialist teachers in the senior school.

Girls in the senior school have the opportunity to develop their interests through taking additional study units and their class choices. Girls select a language to learn in year eight, two elective subjects in year nine (choosing from Art, Music, Drama, French, Japanese or Design and Technology) and may change one of these subjects at the beginning of year ten. In years eleven and twelve classes are also offered at Vocational Education Training (VET), the Armidale Combined Schools Program and the Open High School in order to allow girls to further pursue their interests and prepare for tertiary education and their chosen careers.

Boarding 
NEGS has four boarding houses - Kirkwood, Dickens, White and Saumarez - to accommodate its many boarders. Boarders from years five to ten share a room with girls from their own year group, and all girls in years eleven and twelve have their own private room. In year twelve, girls move into Saumarez House. The senior boarding house allows girls to concentrate on their studies without the distraction of younger years and gives the girls more freedom with later bedtimes and more opportunities to visit town. Throughout their time at NEGS most girls will experience boarding in some way, either as a full boarder, part-time boarder or a casual stay. Boarding enhances the community feeling of the school and is a fun and friendly experience.

Notable alumnae 
Alumnae of NEGS are known as Old Girls and may elect to join the schools alumni association, the NEGS Old Girls' Union (NEGSOGU). Some notable NEGS Old Girls include:

 Ursula Hope McConnel – anthropologist
 Dame Bridget Margaret Ogilvie  – scientist; visiting Professor at the University College London
 Molly Taylor – racing driver
 Barbara Mary Vernon – playwright
 Judith Wright – Australian poet and author

See also 

 List of non-government schools in New South Wales
 List of boarding schools in Australia
 Board of Studies

References

External links
 NEGS website

Girls' schools in New South Wales
Boarding schools in New South Wales
Educational institutions established in 1895
Anglican secondary schools in New South Wales
Anglican primary schools in New South Wales
Association of Heads of Independent Girls' Schools
Junior School Heads Association of Australia Member Schools
Schools in Armidale, New South Wales
1895 establishments in Australia
Alliance of Girls' Schools Australasia